The Holy Transfiguration Orthodox Church is a western rite Orthodox parish, located in Mountain Home, Arkansas. Since February 2017 the parish is affiliated with the Russian Orthodox Church Outside of Russia.

History

Founding
The church was founded on August 8, 2004 and became a parish in the United Episcopal Church of North America, which is a jurisdiction of the Continuing Anglican movement, but later voted to align with the Reformed Episcopal Church in 2009. In the same year, with the Anglican realignment movement, in which the REC took part, the church joined the Anglican Church in North America. The church's current building was finished in late 2007 and early 2008. The parish became Orthodox in 2015.  In August of 2019, on the feast day of Holy Transfiguration, Saint Thomas Orthodox Church was elevated by his Eminence Metropolitan Hilarion Kapral to be renamed to Holy Transfiguration Orthodox Church.

REC
In March 2009 three parishes, a bishop and archdeacon departed from the UECNA. Approximately one month later, on April 19, 2009, St. Thomas Anglican Church's congregation voted to align with the Reformed Episcopal Church, who would be a founding jurisdiction of the Anglican Church in North America. Seamans was accepted by the REC and continues to serve at his church in Mountain Home.

Affiliation
On November 22, 2015 in a Parish Meeting, St. Thomas voted to leave the Anglican Church in North America and the REC and voted to become a Western Rite Parish of the Antiochian Orthodox Christian Archdiocese of North America. In February 2017 the parish voted to affiliate with the Russian Orthodox Church Outside of Russia (ROCOR).

References

External links
 Saint Thomas Orthodox Mission - official site

Antiochian Orthodox Church in the United States
Buildings and structures in Baxter County, Arkansas
Churches in Arkansas
Mountain Home, Arkansas
Russian Orthodox Church Outside of Russia
2004 establishments in Arkansas